Zofia Walasek (6 January 1933 – 23 January 2022) was a Polish middle-distance runner. She competed in the women's 800 metres at the 1960 Summer Olympics.

She died in Katowice on 23 January 2022, at the age of 89.

References

External links
 

1933 births
2022 deaths
Athletes (track and field) at the 1960 Summer Olympics
Polish female middle-distance runners
Olympic athletes of Poland